The list of Trump rallies has been spread across two articles on Wikipedia:

 List of rallies for the 2016 Donald Trump presidential campaign
 List of post–2016 election Donald Trump rallies